Sheikh Toufik El Hibri, (1869–1954) was one of the primary founders of the Scout movement in Lebanon, as well as one of the earliest promoters of the Scouting movement in the Arab world, while much of the region was still within the Ottoman Empire. He was born in "Harat Eljourah" (حارة الجورة) neighborhood of central Beirut. He died in Beirut on 7 October 1954.

Life
His family was brought up in a religious family and received his education in the presence of well known sheiks in the "Omari Mosque" and Emir Monzer Mosque.

He had the opportunity to learn his religion and life wisdom from different scientist from around the world like Morocco, Damascus, India and many famous visitors to Beirut who had acquaintance with his father.

Social activities
He had many social activities some of which are: President of the Islamic Teaching and Education Committee school which started in 1899.

Scouting activities
In 1905, he sponsored two young Indian men who came to Beirut to continue their post secondary education. He supported them to establish a new youth movement that was initiated by Baden-Powell which he called the "Ottoman Scout." After the end of World War I, he recreated the Scout movement under the name "The Moslem Scout" (الكشاف المسلم ). He sent delegates to Libya to help establishing a Scout movement there.

In 1973, his son Muhammad el-Hibri was awarded the Bronze Wolf, the only distinction of the World Organization of the Scout Movement, awarded by the World Scout Committee for exceptional services to world Scouting.

Offspring
He is the father of Khalil al-Hibri, a prominent Lebanese politician and businessman, and Mohamad al-Hibri who was an active member of the Lebanese jarah Scout and Yahya Al-Hibri who was a Lebanese Diplomat. His grandchildren are Azizah Y. al-Hibri, a prominent women activist in the United States, and Hind Al Hibri who is involved in scientific research. Ibrahim Al-Hibri was an industrialist and philanthropist and the father of Fuad El-Hibri.

See also

Lebanese Scouting Federation
Türkiye İzcilik Federasyonu

References

1869 births
1954 deaths
Arabs from the Ottoman Empire
Scouting pioneers
Scouting and Guiding in Lebanon